Abbasabad (also Romanized as ‘Abbāsābād; also known as Dehnow-ye ‘Abbāsābād) is a village in Posht Rud Rural District, in the Central District of Narmashir County, Kerman Province, Iran. At the 2006 census, its population was 35, in 9 families.

References 

Populated places in Narmashir County